Peter Hart Gregory, CISA, CISSP is an American information security advisor, computer security specialist, and writer. He is the author of several books on computer security and information technology.

Biography 
Peter Hart Gregory is a member of the Board of Advisors and lecturer for the NSA-certified University of Washington
Certificate in Information Security and Risk Management, a member of the Board of Advisors for the University of Washington Certificate in Cloud Transition Strategies and Management, and on the Board of Advisors and the lead instructor (emeritus) for the University of Washington Certificate in Information Systems Security. He is a founding member of the Pacific CISO Forum.

As an InfraGard member, Gregory served as an expert witness in the 2006 cybercrime case, United States vs. Christopher Maxwell.

Publications 

 Gregory, Peter. Solaris Security, Prentice-Hall, 1999. 
 Gregory, Peter. Solaris Security (Japanese Language Edition), Prentice-Hall, 1999. 
 Gregory, Peter. Solaris Security (Chinese Language Edition), Prentice-Hall, 1999. 
 Gregory, Peter. Sun Certified System Administrator for Solaris 8 Study Guide, Prentice-Hall, 2001. 
 Gregory, Peter. Enterprise Information Security, Financial Times Management, 2003. 
 Gregory, Peter. Enterprise Information Security (Romanian Language Edition), Financial Times Management, 2003. 
 Gregory, Peter; Miller, Lawrence. CISSP for Dummies, John Wiley & Sons, 2003. 
 Gregory, Peter; Miller, Lawrence. Security+ Certification for Dummies, John Wiley & Sons, 2003. 
 Gregory, Peter. Computer Viruses for Dummies, John Wiley & Sons, 2004. 
 Gregory, Peter; Simon, Mike. Blocking Spam and Spyware for Dummies, John Wiley & Sons, 2005. 
 Gregory, Peter. VoIP Security for Dummies, Avaya Limited Edition, John Wiley & Sons, 2006. 
 Gregory, Peter. SIP Communications for Dummies, Avaya Limited Edition, John Wiley & Sons, 2006. 
 Gregory, Peter. Converged Network Security for Dummies, Avaya Limited Edition, John Wiley & Sons, 2007. 
 Gregory, Peter. IP Multimedia Subsystems for Dummies, Radisys Limited Edition, John Wiley & Sons, 2007. 
 Gregory, Peter. Midsized Communications Solutions for Dummies, Avaya Limited Edition, John Wiley & Sons, 2007. 
 Gregory, Peter. Comunicaciones para Medianas Empresas para Dummies, Edicion Limitada de Avaya, John Wiley & Sons, 2007. 
 Gregory, Peter. Unified Communications for Dummies, Avaya Limited Edition, John Wiley & Sons, 2007. 
 Gregory, Peter. Comunicações Unificadas, Edicao Espeçial da Avaya, John Wiley & Sons, 2007. 
 Gregory, Peter. Securing the Vista Environment, O'Reilly Media, 2007. 
 Gregory, Peter; Miller, Lawrence. CISSP for Dummies, Second Edition, John Wiley & Sons, 2007. 
 Gregory, Peter. IT Disaster Recovery Planning for Dummies, John Wiley & Sons, 2007. 
 Gregory, Peter; Simon, Mike. Biometrics for Dummies, John Wiley & Sons, 2008. 
 Gregory, Peter; Miller, Lawrence. SIP Communications For Dummies, Avaya 2nd Custom Edition, John Wiley & Sons, 2009. 
 Gregory, Peter. CISSP Guide to Security Essentials, Thomson Course Technology, 2009. 
 Gregory, Peter. CISA Certified Information Systems Auditor All-in-One Exam Guide, McGraw-Hill, 2009. 
 Gregory, Peter; Miller, Lawrence. CISSP For Dummies, Third Edition, John Wiley & Sons, 2009. 
 Gregory, Peter. CISA Certified Information Systems Auditor All-in-One Exam Guide, Second Edition, McGraw-Hill, 2011. 
 Gregory, Peter. Data Backup For Dummies, eVault Data Protection Edition, John Wiley & Sons, 2009. 
 Gregory, Peter. Firewalls For Dummies, Sonicwall Edition, John Wiley & Sons, 2011. 
 Gregory, Peter. Advanced Physical Access Control For Dummies, HID Global Edition, John Wiley & Sons, 2011. 
 Gregory, Peter; Miller, Lawrence. CISSP for Dummies, Fourth edition, John Wiley & Sons, 2012. 
 Gregory, Peter. CISSP Guide to Security Essentials, Second Edition, Cengage Learning, 2015. 
 Gregory, Peter. Advanced Persistent Threat Protection For Dummies, John Wiley & Sons, 2013. 
 Gregory, Peter. Stopping Zero Day Exploits For Dummies, John Wiley & Sons, 2013. 
 Gregory, Peter. Getting An Information Security Job For Dummies, John Wiley & Sons, 2015. 
 Gregory, Peter; Hughes, Bill. Getting A Networking Job For Dummies, John Wiley & Sons, 2015. 
 Gregory, Peter; DRaaS For Dummies, Veeam Software Special Edition, John Wiley & Sons, 2016. 
 Gregory, Peter; Miller, Lawrence. CISSP for Dummies, Fifth edition, John Wiley & Sons, 2016. 
 Gregory, Peter. CISA Certified Information Systems Auditor All-in-One Exam Guide, Third Edition, McGraw-Hill, 2016. 
 Gregory, Peter. CISM Certified Information Security Manager All-in-One Exam Guide, McGraw-Hill, 2018. 
 Gregory, Peter; Miller, Lawrence. CISSP For Dummies, Sixth edition, John Wiley & Sons, 2018. 
 Gregory, Peter. CISM Certified Information Security Manager Practice Exams, McGraw-Hill, 2019. 
 Gregory, Peter. CISA Certified Information Systems Auditor All-in-One Exam Guide, Fourth Edition, McGraw-Hill, 2019. 
 Gregory, Peter. CISA Certified Information Systems Auditor Practice Exams, McGraw-Hill, 2020. 
 Gregory, Peter. Chromebook For Dummies, Second edition, John Wiley & Sons, 2020. 
 Gregory, Peter. CDPSE Certified Data Privacy Solutions Engineer All-in-One Exam Guide, McGraw-Hill, 2021. 
 Gregory, Peter. CIPM Certified Information Privacy Manager All-in-One Exam Guide, McGraw-Hill, 2021. 
 Gregory, Peter; Miller, Lawrence. CISSP For Dummies, Seventh edition, John Wiley & Sons, 2022. 
 Gregory, Peter; Rogers, Bobby; Dunkerley, Dawn. CRISC Certified in Risk and Information Systems Control All-in-One Exam Guide, Second edition, McGraw-Hill, 2022. 
 Gregory, Peter. The Art of Writing Technical Books, Waterside Productions, 2022. 
 Gregory, Peter. CISM Certified Information Security Manager All-in-One Exam Guide, Second edition, McGraw-Hill, 2022. 
 Gregory, Peter. CISM Certified Information Security Manager Practice Exams, Second edition, McGraw-Hill, 2023. 
 Gregory, Peter. Chromebook For Dummies, Third edition, John Wiley & Sons, 2023. 

Gregory has written several articles for Computerworld and Software Magazine including:
 Protect Apps and Data with a Disaster Recovery Plan
 Identify Vulnerabilities with Application Scanning Tools
 Integrity begins within: Security pros lead by example
 Vulnerability Management Ushers an Era of Technical Risk Management
 Security in the software development life cycle
 Tipping sacred cows: Make bold decisions to protect your information
 Lessons learned from the blaster worm
 For an infosecurity career, get the technical basics first

Gregory has been interviewed by trade publications including Information Security Magazine, CIO Magazine, Computerworld, eWeek, SearchSecurity, and Forbes.

See also 
 Computer Security
 InfraGard
 Certified Information Systems Security Professional
 Certified Information System Auditor

References

External links 
 Security drives information analyst, day and night
 University of Washington Certificate in Information Security & Risk Management
 University of Washington Certificate in Information Systems Security
 InfraGard
 Personal website

Year of birth missing (living people)
Living people
American technology writers
Writers about computer security